Lake Peipus dialect is a Russian language variety spoken on both sides of the Lake Peipus in Pskov Oblast, Russia and some counties of Estonia. It originated as a mix of Pskov and Gdov dialects of the Central Russian cluster. As many other dialects from this area, it is often considered to be transitional between Russian and Belarusian. Lake Peipus dialects also include some loanwords from the Estonian language.

The dialect has been studied and described by Olga Rovnova of the University of Tartu who has conducted fieldwork in Russian Old Believers' communities in Estonia.

Examples 

Lake Peipus dialect: 

Standard Russian: 

English: Do not stain your clothes, who will wash and clean it?

References

Russian dialects
Languages of Estonia